The 2012 Clásica de San Sebastián was the 32nd edition of the Clásica de San Sebastián, a single-day cycling race. It was the twenty-first event of the 2012 UCI World Tour season.

The race was won for the second time in three years by  rider Luis León Sánchez after making a late-race attack on the descent from the Alto de Arkale.

Teams
As the Clásica de San Sebastián was a UCI World Tour event, all 18 UCI ProTeams were invited automatically and obligated to send a squad. Two other squads –  and  – were given wildcard places into the race, and as such, formed the event's 20-team peloton.

The 20 teams that competed in the race were:

Results

References

Clásica de San Sebastián
San Sebastian
Clasica de San Sebastian